Damaskinos or Damaskenos ("from Damascus"), is a Greek name, found both as a first name and as a surname. It can refer to:

 Nikolaos Damaskenos (1st century BC), Greek historian and philosopher
 John of Damascus (c. 676-749), named Ioannes Damaskenos in Greek
 Michael Damaskinos (c. 1530–1593), post-Byzantine painter from Crete
 Damaskinos Stouditis (d. 1577), Greek Orthodox bishop
 Archbishop Damaskinos of Athens (1891–1949), Greek Orthodox Archbishop of Athens and Regent of Greece
 Archbishop Damaskinos of Jaffa (b. 1952), Greek Orthodox bishop
 Eli Damaskinos (d. 2002), Vampire Overlord from Blade II

Greek masculine given names